The England cricket team toured South Africa from 8 November 1938 to 14 March 1939, playing five Test matches against the South Africa national team and (as the Marylebone Cricket Club) 13 tour matches against various provincial sides. England won the third Test by an innings and 13 runs, but the other four Tests finished as draws, including the final timeless Test, which was played over the course of 10 days (not including two rest days). The final Test was declared a draw, as the England team had to leave to ensure they caught the boat home from Cape Town.

Test series

1st Test

The South African innings of 390 featured an unbalanced scorecard - there were five half-centuries, a single-figure score and five players failed to score.

2nd Test

3rd Test

4th Test

5th Test

Tour matches
8–9 November (The Strand): Marylebone Cricket Club (589/8d) vs Western Province County District (140 & 107). MCC won by an innings and 342 runs.
12–15 November (Newlands, Cape Town): Western Province (174 & 169) vs Marylebone Cricket Club (276 & 69/2). MCC won by 8 wickets.
19–22 November (Athletic Club Ground, Kimberley): Marylebone Cricket Club (676) vs Griqualand West (114 & 273). MCC won by an innings and 289 runs.
26–28 November (Ramblers Cricket Club Ground, Bloemfontein): Orange Free State (128 & 260) vs Marylebone Cricket Club (412/6d). MCC won by an innings and 24 runs.
3–6 December (Kingsmead, Durban): Natal (307 & 30/0) vs Marylebone Cricket Club (458). Match drawn.
10–13 December (Berea Park, Pretoria): North Eastern Transvaal (161 & 142) vs Marylebone Cricket Club (379/6d). MCC won by an innings and 76 runs.
16–19 December (Old Wanderers, Johannesburg): Transvaal (428/8d & 174/2) vs Marylebone Cricket Club (268). Match drawn.
7–9 January (St George's Oval, Port Elizabeth): Eastern Province (172 & 111) vs Marylebone Cricket Club (518/6d). MCC won by an innings and 235 runs.
13–16 January (Jan Smuts Ground, East London): Border (121 & 275) vs Marylebone Cricket Club (320 & 79/1). MCC won by 9 wickets.
27–30 January (Old Wanderers, Johannesburg): Combined Transvaal/Northern Transvaal XI (304 & 220/2) vs Marylebone Cricket Club (434). Match drawn.
4–7 February (Queens Sports Club, Bulawayo): Marylebone Cricket Club (307/5d) vs Rhodesia (242). Match drawn.
10–13 February (Salisbury Sports Club, Salisbury): Marylebone Cricket Club (180 & 174/2d) vs Rhodesia (96 & 95/6). Match drawn.
25–28 February (City Oval, Pietermaritzburg): Natal (295 & 219) vs Marylebone Cricket Club (407 & 110/1). MCC won by 9 wickets.

References

External links
Tour home at ESPNcricinfo
England to South Africa 1938-39 at Test Cricket Tours

Further reading
 John Lazenby, Edging Towards Darkness: The Story of the Last Timeless Test, Bloomsbury, London, 2017

1938 in English cricket
1939 in English cricket
England 1938-39
1938-39
International cricket competitions from 1918–19 to 1945